Blendi Fevziu (born May 18, 1969, Tirana, Albania) is an Albanian journalist, writer and host of the TV talk show Opinion, which first went on air on August 31, 1997.

Fevziu graduated in literature and Albanian language at the University of Tirana in 1991. In 1989 he was part of the staff of the Student newspaper of the University. In December 1990 and February 1991 he was an active participant in the students' movement that brought the change of regime in Albania. On January 5, 1991 he was the co-founder of the "RD" (Democratic Renaissance) newspaper, the first free newspaper after almost 70 years of independent media blackout in Albania.

Career in written press 
Chief editor of "Koha Jone" newspaper 1992
Chief editor of "Aleanca" newspaper 1993–6
Co-chief editor of "Poli i Qendrës" newspaper 1996
Editor of political news "Indipendent" newspaper 1997
Editor of Klan Magazine 1996–2001
Editor of "Korrieri" newspaper 2001–5
Editor of "Koha Jone" newspaper 2007–8

Career in TV 
On August 31, 1997, Fevziu started "Sunday's Debate" on TVSH (Public TV), a weekly political debate. On September 26, 1998, he moved to Klan Television and, from 1999, the show aired on Thursdays instead of Sundays.

In 2001, it was renamed "Opinion", and from October 2006 it was broadcast twice a week. Since 2008, "Opinion" has aired four times a week.

Bibliography 

100 soldiers (1992; with co-author Ben Blushi);
Pedestals without statues (1994);
The other half of the world (1996);
In front and behind the cameras (1999);
50 + 1 (2004);
History of the Albanian press 1848–2005 (2005);
My life – Interview with Blendi Fevziu (2010);
Volcanic ashes (2010);
Pedestals without statues (reprinted, revised edition; 2011);
Enver Hoxha (biography; 2011);
100 Years (a history of the state of Albania from 1912 to 2012; pub. 2012);
"Ahmet Zogu, King of Albania" (biography; 2014).

Fevziu's biography of Hoxha was published in English, with an introduction by Robert Elsie, as Enver Hoxha: The Iron Fist of Albania by I.B.Tauris in 2016.

References

External links 
Interview with Robert Elsie about the Hoxha biography, BBC, March 17, 2016

Albanian journalists
Living people
1969 births
People from Tirana
Albanian atheists
Toptani family